The Ministry of Culture (Ministerstvo na kulturata) of Bulgaria is the ministry charged with overseeing and stimulating the cultural work in the country and preserving its cultural heritage. It first existed as a separate institution in 1954–1957, previously being part of the Ministry of Enlightenment and then active under various names until promoted back to a ministry in 1990 (but once again briefly united with the Ministry of Education and Science in 1993).

The current minister, appointed in 2021, is Atanas Atanasov.

External links
 Official website 

Culture
Bulgaria
Bulgaria, Culture
Bulgaria, Culture
Bulgaria, Culture
1954 establishments in Bulgaria
1990 establishments in Bulgaria
1993 establishments in Bulgaria
1957 disestablishments in Bulgaria
1993 disestablishments in Bulgaria